Devín Castle (  or  ,) is a castle in Devín, which is a borough of Bratislava, the capital of Slovakia.

Description
The site has been settled since the Neolithic Age and fortified since the Bronze and Iron Age and later by Celts and Romans.

The cliff (elevation 212 meters) is an ideal place for a fort due to its position at the confluence of the Danube and Morava rivers. The fort watches over an important trade route along the Danube as well as one branch of the Amber Road.

The castle stands just inside Slovak territory on the frontier between Slovakia and Austria. The border runs from west to east along the Morava River and subsequently the Danube. Prior to 1989, the Iron Curtain between the Eastern Bloc and the West ran just in front of the castle. Although the castle was open to the public, the area surrounding it constituted a restricted military zone and was heavily fortified with watchtowers and barbed wire. After the Velvet Revolution the area was demilitarised.

The most photographed part of the castle is the tiny watchtower, known as the Maiden Tower. Separated from the main castle, it balances perilously on a lone rock and has spawned countless legends concerning imprisoned lovelorn daughters leaping to their deaths.

Inside the castle is a sprawling landscape of walls, staircases, open courtyards, and gardens in various states of disrepair. A restoration project is ongoing since the end of World War II.

Etymology 
The name of the castle is probably derived from the old Indo-European/Proto-Slavic stem  with apophony  related to light and visual perception. , and similar Slavic names can be interpreted as watchtowers or observation points. The same root related to vision can be found also in the word  (evil spirit) thus meaning "the place of evil spirits". The  explained the name from the Slavic word —a girl (""). In this case,  means "castle of the girl" (according to a linguist Šimon Ondruš, this etymology is less likely).

History 

Devín castle is one of the oldest castles in Slovakia. The castle was likely first mentioned in written sources in 864, when Louis the German besieged Prince Rastislav in one of the frequent wars between the Franks and Great Moravia respectively in the "castle of Dowina". On the other hand, the identification of Dowina with Devín Castle has been under debate based on alleged linguistic arguments and the absence of convincing archaeologic evidence.

During the Great Moravian period, Devín was the center of a larger agglomeration. Its defensive role was strengthened by smaller hill forts on Devínska Kobyla (Na pieskach, Nad lomom). A pre-romanesque church was built on the castle approximately between 850 and 863/870. 
Its rare style is closest to churches from the Dalmatia and Noricum, from the areas with a persisting tradition of late antique and Byzantine architecture. The interior of the church was decorated with frescoes painted by colors originated (according to chemical analysis) in northern Italy. Two styluses discovered by later research can indicate administrative or education work of the local priests. Along with other artifacts, six graves dated to the Great Moravian era were found near the church and are attributed to members of a retinue of the local ruler and their family members.

In the 13th century, a stone castle was built to protect the western frontier of the Hungarian Kingdom whose existence was documented in 1271, and a reference to a castelanus de Devin appeared in 1326. Between 1301 and 1323, the castle (together with Bratislava/Pressburg County) was held by the Dukes of Austria who granted it to Otto von Tellesbrunn. In 1323, the dukes transferred Pozsony County back to King Charles I of Hungary and Devín Castle became the possession of the heads (ispáns) of the county. In 1385, the castle was occupied by Margrave Jobst of Moravia who held it until 1390 when King Sigismund of Hungary redeemed it and gave it to duke Stibor of Stiboricz. After that, the king mortgaged Devín Castle to an Austrian knight, Lessel Hering who transferred the castle to Nicholas II Garay (the Palatine of the Kingdom) in 1414. Around 1444, King Frederick IV of Germany occupied the castle but he granted it to Ladislaus Garai already in 1450.

The palace was added in the 15th century. The fortifications were reinforced during the wars against the Ottoman Empire. The Castle was never taken, but after the Hungarian Kingdom joined the Habsburg monarchy and the Ottomans were finally defeated, it ceased to be an important border fortress and was no longer used by the military. Stephen Báthory got the castle by the king as a donation. But according to Stephen Báthory was Keglević the owner of the castle. Keglević pawned the castle for 40,000 guilders to the Palocsai family and spent the money. In 1609, Matthias II confirmed that Keglević still was the owner of the castle, but Keglević did not have the money to take the castle out of pledge from the Palocsai family. Nearly 100 years later in 1635 Palatine Pál Pálffy took the castle out of pledge from the Palocsai family. The last owners of the Devín Castle were the Counts of the Pálffy family. Only in 1809, after the Siege of Pressburg, the castle was (which may have still been considered a threat) destroyed by the retreating forces of Napoleon I of France. Napoleon and Leopold Pálffy negotiated then and they both agreed that Vienna is supplied with products by Pálffy.

Since the 19th century as its history inspired several Romantic poets, followers of Ľudovít Štúr, Devín has become an important national symbol for the Slovaks. It featured both on the reverse of the former 500 Czechoslovak koruna banknote and the 50 Halierov coin of the Slovak currency.

The Hungarians regarded it as the western gateway of the Kingdom of Hungary. The Hungarian poet Endre Ady used it as a symbol of modernism and Westernization in his poem I am the Son of Gog and Magog:

Some parts of the castle have been reconstructed in the 20th century and the castle hosts an interesting museum. Archaeological works at the site have revealed the remains of a Roman tower dating from the 1st century AD and evidence of a prehistoric settlement.

Cultural references 

Patrick Leigh Fermor describes approaching the castle whilst walking eastwards along the Danube in 1934, “The climbing roofs were dominated by a hill and the symmetry of this huge gaunt castle and the heigh of its corner-towers gave it the look of an upside-down table.”

See also 
 History of Bratislava
 Tourism in Slovakia
List of castles in Slovakia

References

Sources

Engel, Pál: Magyarország világi archontológiája (1301–1457) (The Temporal Archontology of Hungary (1301-1457)); História - MTA Történettudományi Intézete, 1996, Budapest; .

External links

Short description of Devín
Defending Bratislava at Devin - Spectacular Slovakia
A video tour round the castle

Castles in Slovakia
Archaeological sites in Slovakia
Buildings and structures in Bratislava
Great Moravia
Romanesque architecture in Slovakia
Gothic architecture in Slovakia
9th-century architecture in Slovakia
13th-century architecture in Slovakia
Tourist attractions in Bratislava
Roman sites in Slovakia
Rock formations of Slovakia